The Directorate-General for Communications Networks, Content and Technology  (also called Connect) is a Directorate-General of the European Commission and is responsible for EU investment in research, innovation and development of critical digital technologies (such as Artificial Intelligence, Common Data Spaces, High-Performance Computing, 5G, Micro-Electronics, Blockchain and Quantum).

The current Director-General is Roberto Viola, under the responsibility of the European Commissioner for Internal Market.

Structure 

Directorates
The organization of the Director General office  was: 
 A: Artificial Intelligence and Digital Industry (Director: Lucilla Sioli)
The directorate's objective is to strengthen the competitiveness and to ensure that any industry in any sector in Europe can make the best use of digital innovations to compete on a global scale, grow and create jobs. The directorate is responsible for the coordination of the digitisation of industry strategy following the adoption of the DSM technology package in April 2016 including links with national initiatives such as Industrie 4.0 (DE), industrie du future (FR), smart industry (NL), etc.

 B: Connectivity (Director: Rita Wezenbeek)
Designing and monitoring a legally predictable (regulatory) environment for electronic communications in the EU. As the basis for the Digital Single Market, this environment should foster a pro-competitive single market for the roll-out of high-speed internet networks and the delivery of electronic communications services. This will be an essential contribution to boost innovation, growth and jobs in Europe.

 Directorate C: Digital Excellence and Science Infrastructure (Director: Thomas Skordas)
Directorate provides support to future ICT Technologies and Infrastructures such as the Destination Earth.

 D: Policy Strategy and Outreach (Director: Thibaut Kleiner)
The Policy Strategy and Outreach Directorate is responsible for the consistent implementation of the Commission Work Programme and the legislation under the responsibility of DG CONNECT in line with better regulation principles.

It ensures coherence between the DSM strategy and the available EU financial instruments, notably the ICT part of H2020 and the Connecting Europe Facility (CEF), but also the European structural and investment funds (EFSI) and the European Fund for Strategic Investments (EFSI).

It is the outward-facing element of the DG, responsible for involving stakeholders in delivering policy and research outcomes, engaging with member states' authorities and the other institutions, the media and other interested stakeholders, and for communicating within and outside the EU and managing internal communication with in the DG.
 E: Future Networks (Director: Pearse O'Donohue)
The Directorate is responsible for strategic advancement of the policy, technological research and standardisation on all-encompassing Future Internet dimension, ensuring an innovative intertwining of all these aspects so that Europe can lead in the design, piloting and roll-out of the Internet of tomorrow. Its strategic agenda focuses on components that are crucial for the digital economy, including 5G global policy advancement, research, innovation and deployment of future mobile systems, strategic use of spectrum, implementation of cloud policies, support to software strategy and implementation of a common European IoT agenda, while addressing a long-term perspective for the Internet. It promotes large-scale, experimentally-driven research, validation and piloting of future Internet systems, services and architectures. It implements an innovative industrial strategy exploring the benefits of Internet to all sectors of economy and society in line with the priorities on digitisation of the European economy. The Directorate acts as a centre of competence for DSM-related issues on Cloud policies, Free-Flow of Data and IoT liability with stakes on open service platforms. The Directorate acts from a global perspective, exploiting multilateral cooperation and reinforcing Internet governance.

 F: Digital Transformation (Director ff: Fabrizia Benini)
Directorate F is responsible for defining and implementing the overall strategy for the digital economy and society. It will develop, coordinate and steer the Digital Single Market (DSM) strategy and monitor its effective implementation in the context of the European semester based on socioeconomic data on the digital society and economy. It has direct responsibility for e-commerce, geo-blocking and platforms. It will also develop and implement the innovation strategy in particular geared towards web-tech and start-up companies and the development of digital skills.

 G: Data (Director: Yvo Volman)
The mission of Directorate G is threefold: to set up framework conditions for a thriving European data economy, to exploit the potential of the European cultural heritage and creative industries; to contribute to removing digital barriers that lead to social and economic disparities, such as language, accessibility and education.

 H: Digital Society, Trust and Cybersecurity (Director: Lorena Boix Alonso)
To improve the life of citizens, the opportunities for companies and the quality of public administrations in major areas of society and economy. To provide a strategic approach to the societal dimension of the DSM, focusing on applications that combine digital policy, digital Research and Innovation, and deployment and provide for leadership in cyber security and digital privacy and digital trust policy, legislation and innovation. To pay specific attention to the interplay of EU digital policy and digital technologies with EU policy in application areas such as transport, energy, climate, environment, health, ageing, employment, public sector, security and data protection. To provide for the co-chairing of the health, innovation/inclusion and security societal challenges of Horizon 2020. As many of the societal challenges are global it has a strong international involvement.
 I: Media Policy (Director: Giuseppe Abbamonte)
The Directorate supports the development of a competitive European audiovisual and media industry able to reach out to new audiences and thrive in the Digital Single Market. The Directorate ensures that the audiovisual and copyright legislative frameworks are fit for purpose in the digital era and promote the circulation of works across borders and reward innovation. Through support actions it fosters the creation, distribution and promotion of European works across Europe and beyond. It supports research on new technologies and services resulting from convergence and social media in any device and mobile environments.

The Directorate promotes the freedom and pluralism of the media, protection and consumers, minors and cultural and linguistic diversity. It contributes to this goal through its legislative framework and by complementing the activities of the Member States by monitoring the threats to media independence and journalists across the EU. The Directorate promotes Europe's cultural diversity and production of news on European affairs with a European perspective.
 R: Resources and Support (Director: Morten Fjalland)
To support DG Connect's people and operations, including those related to research projects in H2020, CEF, FP7 and CIP, as well as to promote and verify compliance with essential procedures.

Resources 
DG Connect is one of the larger DGs in the European Commission with around 1100 employees in Brussels and Luxembourg, and around one fifth of the total EU research budget. A significant part of its activities is devoted to research in areas where it can provide stimulus and support to Member State research, including coordination, co-operation, standardisation and long-term basic research activities.

Significant staff cuts were planned for 2014.

History 

On 1 July 2012, the DG Connect replaced the DG for Information Society & Media (DG INFSO). The mission will also change and large staff cuts are foreseen (from 1 January 2013 a substantial part of the ex-INFSO agenda will be externalised). DG INFSO was previously known as DG XIII.  Until 2004, the DG shared Commissioner with DG Enterprise.

From January 2005, the DG Information Society was expanded to include Media (formerly under DG Education and Culture). DG INFSO deals with research, policy and regulation on the areas of information and communication technology and media. Its regulation has cultural, societal and economic objectives, and covers some of the largest economic sectors in Europe, as well as some of the most visible. The DG is however not responsible for some general economic and market issues central to information society policies like intellectual property issues.

See also 
 European Commissioner for Internal Market
 Executive Vice President of the European Commission for A Europe Fit for the Digital Age
 Ambient Assisted Living (AAL)
 European Institute for Health Records (EUROREC)
 European Round Table of Industrialists
 Media Plus
 ProRec
 World Intellectual Property Organization
 EU Open Data Portal

References

External links 
Official websites:
 DG Communications Networks, Content and Technology official website
 Mission and Priorities
 Neelie Kroes, VP of the Commission in charge of Digital Agenda for Europe (Internet Archive 2016/09/22)
 Who's who in DG Communications Networks, Content and Technology (Internet Archive 2012/07/21)

Connect main policy website
 2021 - Digital Strategy current website presenting the policies under DG's responsibility
 2016-2021 Digital Single Market (Internet Archive 2021/03/14)
 2012-2016 Digital Agenda for Europe (Internet Archive 2016/02/19)

Information Society and Media
Information society and the European Union
Information technology organizations based in Europe
Framework Programmes